VS-23 was an Anti-Submarine Squadron of the U.S. Navy. It was disestablished on 27 September 1968.

Operational history

VS-23 was embarked on USS Yorktown for three Vietnam deployments:

23 October 1964 – 16 May 1965
6 January-27 July 1966
28 December 1967 – 5 July 1968

On 17 March 1968, an S-2E disappeared on a night anti-submarine patrol. Four days later, aircraft wreckage was recovered, and assumed to be from the plane. All four crewmen were listed as killed in action, but their bodies were never recovered.

Home port assignments
The squadron was assigned to these home ports:
NAS North Island
Los Alamitos NAS, Los Alamitos, California

Aircraft assignment
TBM Avenger
S-2 Tracker

See also
 List of inactive United States Navy aircraft squadrons
 History of the United States Navy

References

External links
VS-23 in 1951

Sea control squadrons of the United States Navy